General elections were held in the Solomon Islands on 22 June 1976. Although contested by three political parties (the People's Progressive Party, the National Democratic Party and the Melanesian Action Party), the Independent Group emerged as the largest group in the Legislative Assembly, and elected Peter Kenilorea Chief Minister.

Results
A total of 177 candidates contested the elections. Only fourteen incumbent MLAs were re-elected, with two ministers – David Thuguvoda and Ashley Wickham – losing their seats. Kenilorea was elected unopposed in East ꞌAreꞌare.

The Independent Group won 15 of the 38 seats, with the National Democratic Party winning eight.

Aftermath
Following the elections, the Legislative Assembly elected the Chief Minister in mid-July, with Kenilorea defeating incumbent Chief Minister Solomon Mamaloni by 21 votes to 16 in the seventh round of voting. Kenilorea subsequently formed a new Council of Ministers.

References

Elections in the Solomon Islands
Solomon
1976 in the Solomon Islands
Legislative Assembly of the Solomon Islands
Election and referendum articles with incomplete results